The American Card Catalog: The Standard Guide on All Collected Cards and Their Values is a reference book for American trading cards produced before 1951, compiled by Jefferson Burdick. Some collectors regard the book as the most important in the history of collectible cards.

First published in 1939 as The United States Card Collectors Catalog, subsequent editions of the ACC came in 1946 (when it was renamed), 1953 and 1960. Only 500 catalogs were printed in 1939, increasing to 3,000 in its last edition of 1960.

It has become the de facto method in identifying and organizing trade cards produced in the Americas pre-1951. The book catalogues sports and non-sports cards, but is best known for its categorization of baseball cards. Sets like 1909-11 White Borders, 1910 Philadelphia Caramel’s, and 1909 Box Tops are most commonly referred to by their ACC catalogue numbers. They are, respectively, T206, E95, and W555.

The following is a list of card classifications in which baseball cards are found. Two examples of each type have been listed.

Card Classifications

N-Cards (19th Century Tobacco)

Examples

 1886 N167 Old Judge New York Giants
 1887 N28 Allen & Ginter
 1887 N175 Gypsy Queen
 1887 N172 Old Judge
 1887 N184 W.S. Kimball Champions
 1887 N284 Buchner Gold Coin
 1887 N370 Lone Jack St. Louis Browns
 1887 N690-1 Kalamazoo Bats
 1887 N690-2 Kalamazoo Teams
 1888 N29 Allen & Ginter
 1888 N43 Allen & Ginter
 1888 N162 Goodwin Champions
 1888 N321 S.F. Hess & Co. California League Creole Cigarettes
 1888 N333 S.F. Hess Newsboys League
 1888 N403 Yum Yum Tobacco
 1889 N526 Number 7 Cigars
 1889 N338-1 S.F. Hess & Co. California League
 1889 N338-2 S.F. Hess & Co. Cigarettes
 1893 N135 Honest Long Cut Tobacco Talk of the Diamond
 1894 N142 Honest Cabinets
 1895 N566 Newsboy Cabinets
 1895 N300 Mayo Cut Plug
 1896 N301 Mayos Die-Cut Game Cards

D-Cards (Bakery/Bread)

Examples
 D310 Pacific Coast Biscuit (1911)
 D311 Pacific Coast Biscuit (1911)
 D322 Tip-Top Bread Pirates (1910)
 D327 Holsum Bread (1917)
 D381 Fleischmann's Bread (1916)
 D382 Tarzan Thoro Bread (1934)
 D383 Koester's Bread World Series Issue (1921)

E-Cards (Caramel)

Examples

 1909-11 E90-1 American Caramel
 1910 E90-2 American Caramel
 1910-11 E90-3 American Caramel
 1908 E91A American Caramel
 1908 E91B American Caramel
 1908 E91C American Caramel
 1908 E91 American Caramel
 1910 E92 Dockman & Sons
 1910 E92 Croft's & Allen (also called Croft's Candy.  backs come in three colors, black, blue and red)
 1910 E92 Croft's Cocoa
 1910 E92 Nadja
 1911 E93 Standard Caramel
 1911 E94 George Close Candy
 1909 E95 Philadelphia Caramel
 1910 E96 Philadelphia Caramel
 1910 E97 Briggs (two variations, color and B&W)
 1909 E98 Anonymous
 1910 E99 Bishop & Company
 1910 E100 Bishop & Company
 1909 E101 Anonymous
 1908 E102 Anonymous
 1910 E103 Williams Caramel Company
 1910 E104-I Nadja Caramels
 1910 E104-II Nadja Caramels
 1910 E104-III Nadja Caramels
 1910 E105 Mello-Mint Gum
 1915 E106 American Caramel Co.
 1903 E107 Breisch Williams
 1922 E120 American Caramel Co.
 1921 E121 American Caramel Co.
 1922 E122 American Caramel Co.
 1923 E123 Curtis Ireland Candy
 1910 E125 American Caramel Co.
 1927 E126 American Caramel
 1917 E135 Collins-McCarthy
 1912 E136 Home Run Kisses
 1914 E145-1 Cracker Jack
 1915 E145-2 Cracker Jack
 1927 E210 York Caramels
 1921-23 E220 National Caramel Company
 1910 E221 Bishop & Company Team Cards
 1910 E222 A.W.H. Caramels
 1888 E223 G & B Chewing Gum
 1914 E224 Texas Tommy
 1921 E253 Oxford Confect.
 1909-11 E254 Colgan's Chips
 1912 E270 Colgan's Chips
 1910 E271 Darby Chocolates
 1933 E285 Rittenhouse Candy
 1910 E286 Ju-Ju Drums
 1912 E300 Plow's Candy

F-Cards (Food -Ice Cream & Dairy)

Examples
 1916    F-UNC Tango Eggs
 1928    F50 Harrington's Ice Cream
 1928    F50 Sweetman
 1928    F50 Tharp's Ice Cream
 1928    F50 Yuengling's Ice Cream
 1937-38 F7 Dixie Lids

M-Cards (Publications)

Examples
 M101-2 Sporting News Supplements (1909–1913)
 M101-4 Sporting News (1916)
 M101-5 Sporting News (1915)
 M101-6 Felix Mendelssohn (1919)
 M101-7 Sporting News Supplements (1926)
 M110 Sporting Life Cabinets
 M116 Sporting Life (1911)
 M117 Sporting Times (1888–1889)

R-Cards (Gum)

Examples
 1933    R317 Douesh Jacks Candy
 1933    R319 Goudey
 1934    R320 Goudey
 1934-36 R327 Diamond Stars
 1933    R333 Delong
 1939    R334 Play Ball
 1952    R414-6 Topps

T-Cards (20th Century Tobacco)

Examples

 T3 Turkey Red (1911)
 T5 Pinkerton Cabinets (1911)
 T200 Fatima Team (1913)
 T201 Mecca Double Folders (1911)
 T202 Hassan Triple Folders (1912)
 T203 Baseball Comics (1910)
 T204 Ramly (1909)
 T205 "Gold Borders" (1911)
 T206 "White Borders" (1909–1911)
 T207 "Brown Background" (1912)
 T208 Fireside Athletics (1912)
 T209 Contentnea (1910)
 T210 Old Mill (1910)
 T211 Red Sun (1910)
 T212 Obak (1909–1911)
 T213 Coupon Cigarettes (1910)
 T214 Victory (1915)
 T215 Red Cross (1910–1913)
 T216 People's (1910–1914)
 T217 Mono Cigarettes Company (1911)
 T222 Fatima Players (1914)
 T227 Honest Long Cut (1912)
 T231 Fan's Cigarettes (1922)
 T330-2 Piedmont Stamps (1914)
 T332 Helmar Stamps (1911)

W-Cards (Strip Cards / Exhibits)

Examples
 1920-21 W514 Strips
 1921    W461 Exhibits
 1946-49 W603 Sports Exchange

WG-Cards (Game Cards)

Examples
 1906    WG2/3 Fan Craze
 1914    WG4 Polo Ground Card Game

V-cards/C-Cards (Non-United States Cards)

Examples

 1910-11   C56 Imperial Tobacco (Hockey, Canada)
 1911-12   C55 Imperial Tobacco (Hockey, Canada)
 1912-13   C57 Imperial Tobacco (Hockey, Canada)
 1923-24   V128-1  Paulin's Candy (Hockey, Canada)
 1923-24   V145-1  William Patterson (Hockey, Canada)
 1924-25   C144  Champ's Cigarettes (Hockey, Canada)
 1924-25   V130  Maple Crispette (Hockey, Canada)
 1924-25   V145-2  William Patterson (Hockey, Canada)
 1928-29   V128-2  Paulin's Candy (Hockey, Canada)
 1933-34   V129  Anonymous (Hockey, Canada)
 1933-34   V252  Canadian Gum (Hockey, Canada)
 1933-34   V288  Hamilton Gum (Hockey, Canada)
 1933-34   V304A  O-Pee-Chee, Series A (Hockey, Canada)
 1933-34   V304B  O-Pee-Chee, Series A (Hockey, Canada)
 1933-34   V357  World Wide Gum Ice Kings (Hockey, Canada)
 1935-36   V304C  O-Pee-Chee (Hockey, Canada)
 1936-37   V304D  O-Pee-Chee (Hockey, Canada)
 1936-37   V356  World Wide Gum (Hockey, Canada)
 1937-38   V304E  O-Pee-Chee (Hockey, Canada)
 1939-40   V301-1  O-Pee-Chee (Hockey, Canada)
 1940-41   V301-2  O-Pee-Chee (Hockey, Canada)

See also
 American football card
 Baseball card
 Hockey card
 Trading card

References

Trading cards
Baseball cards
Publications established in 1939